The Lebanese International University (LIU) is a private university established by the philanthropist and former Lebanese defense and education minister Abdul Rahim Mourad. The language of instruction is English.

History
The Lebanese International University was established in April, 2001, as "The Bekaa University" under Presidential Decree No.5294 as, with its grand campus constructed within the western region of the Beqaa Valley; at Al-Khyara, the West Beqaa (al-Beqaa al-Gharbi).

Having graduated its first Freshman class in June 2002, a new campus in Beirut was opened and the name was changed to "Lebanese International University", or LIU in short. Another five campuses were later built: next to Sidon in south Lebanon, Tyr, Nabatieh, Tripoli and Mount Lebanon.

LIU created buildings in Aden, Sana'a and Taiz in Yemen as well as two additional campuses in Mauritania and Senegal.
LIU opened branches also in Saudi Arabia, UAE, Egypt, and Syria.

The campuses
LIU has nine campuses at different locations in Lebanon: Bekaa, Beirut, Saida, Nabatieh, Mount Lebanon, Tripoli, Tyre, Rayak and Halba-Akkar. The Bekaa Campus is the ‘mother’ of LIU’s many Lebanon based campuses. It has a main cafeteria with more than 500 seating capacity, several shops and eateries, dormitories for both female and male students, and recreational facilities including a pool, a football stadium, several green fields and parking areas. The Beirut Campus is located not far from the Beirut Central District and consists of seven buildings. The campus also has cafeterias; large auditoriums, underground parking, and housing for female and male students in University owned apartment buildings adjacent to campus.

Beirut Campus
The Beirut campus is located within a residential area of Mouseitbeh in west Beirut. It consists of seven buildings, Blocks A to G.

The first building, as shown on the picture, is Block-A. This building is about five to six stories high, and the office of the campus manager can be found at the fifth floor.

The second building, Block-B, is much larger, and it is about eight stories high. Three stories below, the university has an underground parking space and two auditoriums. Major facilities for students, such as the registration office, the business office, and student affairs office, are located at the first floor of the building. The university cafeteria can also be found in this story.
The third building, Block-C, is almost the biggest building among the Blocks, it is about  nine stories high. Two stories below considered as parking, Block-C contains at his ninth floor the Mass Communication offices and Specialized Rooms as a Studio.

Starting Autumn 2011-2012, three new blocks will be founded to acquire the upcoming number of students, named as Block D, E & G
made of five stories each, in addition to the dorms made for the transferring students moving from other campuses to Beirut.

Saida Campus 
The Saida Campus - the second largest in terms of enrolment among LIU campuses. The campus is situated near the Mediterranean coast, in the center of many educational facilities ranging from public elementary schools to public and private universities. LIU in general and the Tripoli Campus in particular pride itself on establishing the idea of a leader in students and instructors diversity. In its serene and tranquil setting, overlooking the cedars mountain of Lebanon and the City of Tripoli, in this widely open bell view of this urban area, where reality of learning takes over the dreams. The true diversity of the Lebanese textile interacts together in the most harmonious.

Nabatieh Campus

Tyre Campus 
The Tyre Campus is the first university in history of the Tyre region which offers students a choice from more than 40 degree programs. The Rayak and Halba-Akkar campus is the newest of LIU campuses.

International expansion
In September 2006, the university announced the opening of its Yemeni campus in Sana'a.

The University also has campuses in Yemen, Morocco, Senegal and Mauritania.

Faculties
The university has five faculties:
 School of Arts and Sciences
 School of Engineering
 School of Business and Management
 School of Pharmacy
 School of Education

School of Education

Degrees Offered 
The School of Education at LIU offers the following degrees: Bachelor's of Education, Teaching Diploma and a Master's of Education. 

To earn a bachelor's degree (a 3-year program), students must complete a minimum of 99 credit hours. For a teaching diploma (a one-year program) students must complete  24 credit hours. For a master's degree (a two-year program), students must complete 39 credit hours.

Admission Requirements 
Applicants prior applying to The School of Education at LIU, must pass the Lebanese Baccalaureate II (any strand) or its equivalent as specified by the Lebanese Ministry of Education and Higher Education. Also, an English Placement Exam or the International TOEFL is required to determine their eligibility.

Programs of Study

Clubs 
At LIU School of Education, students may join the Book/Debate Club where they discuss diverse perspectives related to a certain topic or book.

Events and Initiatives

School of Education

School of Arts and Sciences

Programs of Study 
            The School of Arts & Sciences includes the following different Majors:

Degrees Offered

            The School of Arts & Sciences offers programs leading to the Bachelor Degrees in all major areas listed above. The School also offers a Diploma in Medical Laboratory Technology as a Graduate Program.

The School of Business

Programs of study

The School of Engineering

Programs of study

The School of Pharmacy

Programs of study

The Scope Magazine 
The Scope is the official student-run magazine published by the Lebanese International University (LIU). It covers LIU news on all campuses as well as recent accomplishments by schools, instructors and students.

Name Change 
In June 2017, LIU changed its name to International University of Beirut in all but the Bekaa campuses - Khiara and Rayak - where it remained LIU.

References

Yemen

2001 establishments in Lebanon
Education in Beirut
Educational institutions established in 2001
Universities in Lebanon
Organisations based in Beirut